Mortadella di Campotosto (popularly called mule balls) is a salami produced in limited quantities in the territory of the municipality of Campotosto in the province of Abruzzo. Mortadella di Campotosto it is listed as a traditional Italian food product (P.A.T.) by the Ministry of Agricultural, Food and Forestry Policies.

History
For a period of time the city of Amatrice had appropriated the paternity of the salami, following the dominion it had over the areas of Campotosto and neighboring villages in the medieval period. The tradition of Campotosto mortadella is very ancient, it is believed to be more than 500 years old, as we know it today, only a few Campotostari continue the tradition of mortadella, and only a few palates have the opportunity to taste it today, due to the rarity of the product.

It is included in the Slow Food movement Ark of Taste, an international catalogue of endangered heritage foods.

Description

Mortadella is made only of pork, which shepherds and various farmers raised in the territory of the Monti della Laga. It has an ovoid shape (and a weight traditionally identified as 330 gr). It has a fine grain and inside, it has a lard bar inserted over its entire length that characterizes the product compared to other cured meats. When cut, the section has a pink color, while the central bar of lard has a white color. The preparation of the sausage takes place in the following way:

very fine grinding of the meat;
seasoning with salt, pepper and white wine;
maturation of the mixture for at least 24 hours inside a wooden container (the scifone ) or steel. The dough is mixed several times with an infusion of cloves and cinnamon.The stuffing is done manually, with the casing stitching around the dough. In the lower part of the salami a small trestle is affixed to wrap the string during the loosening due to seasoning.The product can be consumed at least three months after grinding.

References

Italian products with protected designation of origin
Italian sausages
Cuisine of Abruzzo